Sare Jahan Se Achcha  is a patriotic poem of the Urdu language

It may also refer to:
 Sare Jahan se Accha (pencil sketch) — a pencil sketch in Ahmednagar city created in the year 1998 by Pramod Kamble
 Sare Jahan Se Accha Express, a train running between Chitpur and Ahmedabad in India